Natalie Mastracci (born June 5, 1989 in Welland, Ontario) is a Canadian rower.  She was part of the Canadian team at the 2012 Summer Olympics that won a silver medal in the Women's eight.  She attended St. Alexander School in Pelham, Ontario and Syracuse University.

In June 2016, she was officially named to Canada's 2016 Olympic team.

At World Championship level, she has won silver medals in the women's eight in 2011 and 2014, and bronze medals in 2013 and 2015.

References 

 

1989 births
Living people
Sportspeople from Welland
Rowers at the 2012 Summer Olympics
Olympic rowers of Canada
Olympic silver medalists for Canada
Olympic medalists in rowing
Canadian female rowers
Medalists at the 2012 Summer Olympics
Syracuse University alumni
Sportspeople from Ontario

World Rowing Championships medalists for Canada
Rowers at the 2016 Summer Olympics
21st-century Canadian women